Zhang Cunhao (born 23 February 1928) is a Chinese physical chemist and an academician of the Chinese Academy of Sciences.

Biography
Zhang was born in Tianjin, on February 23, 1928, to Zhang Zhu, an engineer, and Long Wenyuan. Zhang's younger brother Zhang Cunji is a hydraulician. Zhang's ancestral home in Wudi County, Shandong. His grandfather Zhang Mingqi was the last Viceroy of Liangguang from April 14 to November 8, 1911, in the Qing Empire. His grandmother was a descendant of Ji Xiaolan. His  maternal grandfather Long Jiguang (1867–1925) was a general of the late Qing and early Republican period of China. His uncles Zhang Rui, Zhang Bo and Zhang Jun were architects. His aunt Zhang Jin (1910–1965) was a chemist and educator. His uncle-in-law Fu Ying (1902–1979) was a physical chemist and chemist and former vice-president of Peking University.

He attended the Chongqing Nankai Secondary School and Changting No. 1 High School. In 1943, he was accepted to Xiamen University but one year later he had transferred to National Central University. In 1948, during the Chinese Civil War, he pursued advanced studies in the United States, earning a master's degree in chemistry from the University of Michigan in 1950. Zhang returned to the newly established Communist State in October that same year.

Since June 1955, Zhang has been working at the Chinese Academy of Sciences (CAS). He was elected an academician in 1980. He became a member of the Academic Degree Commission of the State Council in 1998. He was elected a fellow of The World Academy of Sciences (TWAS) in 1992 and of the Royal Society of Chemistry in 2007.

In 2013, Zhang was awarded the Highest Science and Technology Award, the highest scientific award in China. In 2016, an asteroid was named after Zhang.

Zhang was a delegate to the 13th and 14th National Congress of the Communist Party of China.  He was a deputy to the 3rd National People's Congress. He was also a Standing Committee member of the 8th and 9th Chinese People's Political Consultative Conference.

Personal life
Zhang married Chi Yunxia in 1954, the couple have two sons.

Awards
 1956, 1982 and 1993 National Prize for Natural Sciences, 3rd Class
 1999 and 1997 National Prize for Natural Sciences, 2nd Class
 2002 Science and Technology Award of the Ho Leung Ho Lee Foundation
 2013 Highest Science and Technology Award

References

1928 births
Living people
Chemists from Tianjin
Chinese physical chemists
Members of the Chinese Academy of Sciences
National Central University alumni
Physicists from Tianjin
TWAS fellows
University of Michigan College of Literature, Science, and the Arts alumni